Karen Strassman (born June 5) is an American stage, television and voice actress who has provided English language voices for Japanese anime shows, animation, and video games. Some of her major roles are Kallen Stadtfeld in the Code Geass series, Miyuki Takara in Lucky Star, Nina Fortner in Monster, Rider in Studio Deen's Fate/stay night, Suigintou the first Rozen Maiden doll in Rozen Maiden, Sawako Yamanaka in K-On!, Sola-Ui Nuada-Re Sophia-Ri in Fate/Zero, Momo Hinamori and Soi Fon in Bleach, as well as Sky in the Shantae series and Rouge the Bat in the Sonic the Hedgehog series.

In live-action productions, she portrayed Jolene in the television show Weeds.

Early life and education
Strassman enjoyed acting at a young age, and was involved in school plays. When she was 20, she had moved to France to study psychology and theatre at CNSAD in Paris.

Career
In an interview with Slink FM, she said she picked psychology as a ways to earn a living in case theatre did not pan out. While there, she saw an advertisement calling for actors who could speak English. She got an apprenticeship with Studio VO/VF where she trained as a dialect coach. After a year, she was offered a paid position where she trained older French actors on how to act in English. She also taught kids, where she was recruited by two women who produced a magazine called Hi-Kids which would produce audio cassettes. It was there where she started doing voice-over.

She would later do French and English dubs, and got into video game voice-over. She provided voice over work in French for Air France, Euro-star, Disneyland Paris, and for audio tours of The Louvre and the Musée d'Orsay. As a dialect coach, she worked with Lancôme advertising.

Personal life
Strassman is a naturalized French citizen; she is also fluent in French.

Filmography

Anime

Animation

Feature films

Direct-to-video and television films

Foreign shows dubbing in English

Video games

Live-action roles

Notes

References

Book references

External links

 
 
 

Living people
American expatriate actresses in France
American film actresses
American people of Danish descent
French people of Danish descent
American stage actresses
American television actresses
American video game actresses
American voice actresses
People from Washington, D.C.
20th-century American actresses
21st-century American actresses
Actresses from Los Angeles
Naturalized citizens of France
Year of birth missing (living people)